Towncraft was a compilation LP documenting the punk scene of Little Rock, Arkansas and released by DIY record labels File Thirteen Records, Ahoalton Records, and Lower Case Records. In the summer of 1992, Little Rock saw an explosion of high school punk rock bands after the departures of locals Trusty in 1991 and Econochrist in 1989. A number of youth felt it necessary to document the scene. After several meetings at Denny's with an attendance of over 30 adolescents, Towncraft was born.

Heavily influenced by the DIY ethic, youth run garage sales, bake sales, benefit shows, and a handful of generous donators would come together to put the record out. The 500 copies of Towncraft, sold for $6 each, and were accompanied by a compilation zine, which included entries from 12 different local zines. 

Jason White, who was in Chino Horde and co-writer of Fluke zine, went on to play with Green Day starting in 1997, and is currently a member of Pinhead Gunpowder, Green Day, and The Big Cats.  Colin Brooks, who was in Substance, Sint, and G, played guitar in Red 40 alongside Ben Nichols (current front man of Lucero) and currently plays in  The Big Cats and Dan Zanes.

The album is highlighted in a 2007 documentary also titled Towncraft and is not to be confused with the soundtrack which also contains songs by bands from the original album.

Track listing
Side A
"Vola/Bristle" (Chalk) 
"I'm your Son" (12 ft. 6) 
"Diehard/My Eyes" (Entrance) 
"Taken/Reflection" (Drain)
"Do Nothing King" (Substance)

Side B
"Composite" (Chino Horde)
"Locked Inside" (Outlet) 
"Cut me Down" (five-0)
"Wasson in Wonderland" (g)
"Definition/Petal" (Sint)

External links
File 13 Records
Chino Horde

1992 compilation albums
Punk rock compilation albums